The (= text sign may refer to:

 (= (emoticon), a commonly used marker for a smiling face mainly used by kids and young adults
 (= (currency), a textual representation of the Euro currency in DR-DOS 7.02 (COUNTRY.SYS) in 1998

See also
 C=, a similar looking digraph often used as textual transcription for the Commodore company logo